The Peter Le Marchant Trust is a waterway society, a charitable trust and a registered charity number 1151117, based in Loughborough, Leicestershire, England, UK.

The Trust operates its three boats Symphony, Jubilee, and Serenade (two broad beam boats and one narrowboat) on the Grand Union Canal and adjacent waterways.

For more than forty-five years, the Trust has provided day outings and canal holidays to promote positive mental health for the community and seriously ill people of all ages and disability. The boats are fully accessible, with hydraulic lifts and other facilities.

The Trust's Patron is the former Princess Caroline of Monaco, now Princess Caroline of Hanover.

See also
List of waterway societies in the United Kingdom
Other boating charities offering boating opportunities for disabled people:
Accessible Boating Association -  Basingstoke Canal
Nancy Oldfield Trust  -  Norfolk Broads
Seagull Trust  -  Scotland, Union Canal, Forth and Clyde Canal

References

https://register-of-charities.charitycommission.gov.uk/charity-search/-/charity-details/5034886

External links
 

Disability organisations based in the United Kingdom
Charities based in Leicestershire
Disabled boating